Cedric Agnew (born December 11, 1986) is an American professional boxer. He challenged once for the WBO light heavyweight title in 2014.

Amateur career 

Agnew is a former national Golden Gloves runner-up.

Regional title fights

United States Boxing Council (USNBC) title 
Agnew knocked out Daniel Judah for the USNBC title, a regional title affiliated with the World Boxing Council.  He successfully defended the title against Otis Griffin by decision.

United States Boxing Association (USBA) title 
Agnew defeated Yusaf Mack by decision for the USBA title, a regional title affiliated with the International Boxing Federation.

World title opportunity 
Agnew lost to Sergey Kovalev for the World Boxing Organization world title by 7th round knockout.

Post-world title opportunity 
Agnew fought Dmitry Bivol on the undercard of Andre Ward vs. Sergey Kovalev II, but the fight was not for Bivol's World Boxing Association interim world title, Bivol stopped Agnew in the 4th round.

Professional boxing record

References

External links

African-American boxers
Boxers from Illinois
Light-heavyweight boxers
1986 births
Living people
American male boxers
21st-century African-American sportspeople
20th-century African-American people